Gorka Patricio Luariz-Ayerdi Rona (born 20 December 1992) is a Spanish-born Equatoguinean footballer who plays as a forward for Arenas Club de Getxo and the Equatorial Guinea national team.

Early life
Luariz was born in Zaragoza, Aragon to a Basque father and an Equatoguinean mother, a Bubi from Malabo. He spent his childhood in Sangüesa, Vitoria-Gasteiz and San Sebastián.

Club career
He was called up by the Basque Country national team at youth levels.

Having developed at Antiguoko, he was signed by Athletic Bilbao in 2010, but suffered a cruciate ligament knee injury in his maiden campaign in their youth system and was released after an unremarkable loan with the reserve team of Real Unión.

Since then he moved around several teams, most located in the Basque Country, in the third and fourth tiers of Spanish football.

International career
Luariz made his national team debut as a substitute against Madagascar in the 2019 Africa Cup of Nations qualification.

Personal life
At age 17, Luariz had a sentimental problem which caused him to lose all his body hair. Luariz's middle name, Patricio, is a tribute to his grandfather.

References

External links

Gorka Luariz profile in Athletic Bilbao website

1992 births
Living people
People with alopecia universalis
Citizens of Equatorial Guinea through descent
Equatoguinean footballers
Footballers from the Basque Country (autonomous community)
Association football forwards
Segunda División B players
Tercera División players
Divisiones Regionales de Fútbol players
CD Laudio players
CD Tudelano footballers
Arenas Club de Getxo footballers
Gernika Club footballers
Zamudio SD players
SD Leioa players
Equatorial Guinea international footballers
People of Bubi descent
Equatoguinean sportspeople of Spanish descent
Equatoguinean people of Basque descent
Spanish footballers
Footballers from Zaragoza
Spanish people of Basque descent
Spanish sportspeople of Equatoguinean descent
Spanish people of Bubi descent
Antiguoko players
Athletic Bilbao footballers